Stilbestrol, or stilboestrol, also known as 4,4'-dihydroxystilbene or 4,4'-stilbenediol, is a stilbenoid nonsteroidal estrogen and the parent compound of a group of more potent nonsteroidal estrogen derivatives that includes, most notably, diethylstilbestrol (DES). The term "stilbestrol" is often used incorrectly to refer to DES, but they are not the same compound.

Stilbestrol itself is an active estrogen but is less potent than DES and other derivatives.

Stilbestrol derivatives
The stilbestrol estrogenic drugs include the following:

 Acefluranol (an antiestrogen)
 Benzestrol (technically not a stilbestrol derivative due to its elongated central chain, but a very close analogue and grouped with the stilbestrol estrogens in any case)
 Bifluranol
 Dienestrol
 Dienestrol acetate
 Diethylstilbestrol (commonly, but erroneously shortened to simply “stilbestrol”)
 Diethylstilbestrol diacetate
 Diethylstilbestrol dilaurate
 Diethylstilbestrol dipalmitate
 Diethylstilbestrol dipropionate
 Diethylstilbestrol disulfate
 Diethylstilbestrol monobenzyl ether
 Dimestrol (dianisylhexene, diethylstilbestrol dimethyl ether, dimethoxydiethylstilbene)
 Fosfestrol (diethylstilbestrol diphosphate)
 Furostilbestrol (diethylstilbestrol difuroate)
 ICI-85966 (diethylstilbestrol bis[di(2-chloroethyl)carbamate)
 Mestilbol (diethylstilbestrol monomethyl ether)
 Dimethylstilbestrol
 Hexestrol (dihydrodiethylstilbestrol)
 Diaethiphenum (hexestrol bis(2-diethylaminoethyl) ether) (a coronary vasodilator)
 Hexestrol diacetate
 Hexestrol dicaprylate
 Hexestrol diphosphate
 Hexestrol dipropionate
 Phenestrol (hexestrol bis[4-[bis(2-chloroethyl)amino]phenylacetate)
 Methestrol (promethestrol; dimethylhexestrol)
 Methestrol dipropionate (promethestrol dipropionate)
 Pentafluranol
 Terfluranol

Of the stilbestrol estrogens, diethylstilbestrol, hexestrol, and benzestrol are the most well-known.

Mechanism of action
The stilbestrol estrogens bind with high affinity to both ERα and ERβ.

Closely related compounds

Estrogens closely related to the stilbestrols include paroxypropione (a metabolite of diethylstilbestrol) and the anise and fennel-derived compounds anol, dianol, anethole, dianethole, and photoanethole (from which the stilbestrol estrogens were actually originally derived). The triphenylethylene group of estrogenic drugs that includes triphenylethylene itself, estrobin, chlorotrianisene, broparestrol, ethamoxytriphetol, clomifene, tamoxifen, and more recently developed derivatives is also very closely related structurally to the stilbestrols.

Resveratrol is a stilbenoid with estrogenic properties that is not technically a stilbestrol derivative (it is 3,4',5-stilbenetriol).

Occupational exposure
Occupational exposure to stilbestrol has resulted in gynaecomastia in workers.

See also
 High-dose estrogen

References

Stilbenoids
Synthetic estrogens